The 1962 Florida State Seminoles football team represented Florida State University in the 1962 NCAA University Division football season. This was Bill Peterson's third year as head coach, and he led the team to a 4–3–3 record.

Schedule

Roster
 WR Fred Biletnikoff, So.

References

Florida State
Florida State Seminoles football seasons
Florida State Seminoles football